Tim Duckworth may refer to:
 Tim Duckworth (American football)
 Tim Duckworth (decathlete)